Year 232 (CCXXXII) was a leap year starting on Sunday (link will display the full calendar) of the Julian calendar. At the time, it was known as the Year of the Consulship of Lupus and Maximus (or, less frequently, year 985 Ab urbe condita). The denomination 232 for this year has been used since the early medieval period, when the Anno Domini calendar era became the prevalent method in Europe for naming years.

Events 
 By place 

 Roman Empire 
 Roman–Persian Wars: Emperor Alexander Severus launches a three-pronged counterattack against the Persian forces of King Ardashir I, who have invaded Mesopotamia. However, the Roman army advancing through Armenia is halted. Alexander gives the order to march to the capital at Ctesiphon, but the Romans are defeated, and withdraw to Syria. The result is an acceptance of the status quo, and after heavy losses on both sides, a truce is signed.

 By topic 

 Religion 
 Relics of St. Thomas are brought to Edessa from India.
 Origen founds a school of Christian theology in Palestine.
 Pope Heraclas of Alexandria is the first Bishop of Alexandria to use the appellation of "Pope".

Births 
 August 19 – Marcus Aurelius Probus, Roman emperor (d. 282)
 Cao Fang, Chinese emperor of the Cao Wei state (d. 274) 
 Sun Chen (or Zitong), Chinese general and regent (d. 259)
 Zhang Hua, Chinese official, scholar and poet (d. 300)

Deaths 
 January 30 – Hua Xin, Chinese official and politician (b. 157)
 October 22 – Demetrius I, patriarch of Alexandria (b. 127)
 December 27 – Cao Zhi, Chinese prince and poet (b. 192)
 Cao Hong, Chinese general of the Cao Wei state
 Sun Lü, Chinese general of the Cao Wei state
 Tiberius Julius Sauromates III, Roman client king

References